Similosodus flavicornis is a species of beetle in the family Cerambycidae. It was described by Stephan von Breuning in 1961. It is known from Malaysia, Borneo and Sumatra.

References

flavicornis
Beetles described in 1961